The R.H. Coats Building is a government office building located in the Tunney's Pasture government office complex in Ottawa, Ontario, Canada. It is situated near the intersection of Holland Avenue and Scott Street, beside Tunney's Pasture Station.

Named after Canada's first Dominion Statistician, Robert H. Coats (1874-1960), the R.H. Coats Building was completed in 1976 by the architectural firm Ogilvie and Hogg. It is 26 stories and 99 m in height, making it the tallest tower in Tunney's Pasture. Peregrine falcons are sometimes sighted on the top of this building. It houses Statistics Canada offices and a branch of the Alterna Savings credit union, formerly the CS CO-OP.

See also
List of Ottawa-Gatineau's 10 tallest skyscrapers
Architecture of Ottawa

Notes

References
Emporis.com
Kalman, Harold and John Roaf. Exploring Ottawa: An Architectural Guide to the Nation's Capital. Toronto: University of Toronto Press, 1983.

Federal government buildings in Ottawa
Brutalist architecture in Canada
Government buildings completed in 1976
1976 establishments in Ontario